The Tém (also known as the Temba or Kotokoliare) an ethnic group of Togo, but also found in Benin and Ghana. There is reported to be about 417,000 of the Tém, with 339,000 in Togo, 60,000 in Ghana and 18,000 in Benin. They speak the Tem language.

History 
The Téms originated as a coalition of Gurma chiefdoms who settled around Sokode during the 17th or 18th century. They may have originated from what is now Burkina-Faso. The Téms converted to Islam during the 19th century via the influence of Chakosi merchants. Majority of Téms profess Islam today.

References

Bibliography
Roger (Yaovi) Adjeoda, Ordre politique et rituels thérapeutiques chez les Tem du Togo, L’Harmattan, Paris ; Montréal ; Budapest, 2000, 293 p. (texte remanié d’une thèse soutenue à l’Université de Paris 8 en 1995)
 Jean-Claude Barbier, L'histoire présente, exemple du royaume Kotokoli au Togo, Centre d'étude d'Afrique noire, Institut d'études politiques de Bordeaux, 1983, 72 p.
Mamah Fousseni, La culture traditionnelle et la littérature orale des Tem, Steiner, Stuttgart, 1984, 336 p. (d’après une thèse à l’Université de Francfort-sur-le-Main, 1981)
 Mamah Fousséni, Contes tem, Nouvelles Éditions Africaines, Lomé, 1988, 108 p.
 Suzanne Lallemand, Adoption et mariage : les Kotokoli du centre du Togo, L'Harmattan, 1994, 287 p.
Suzanne Lallemand, La mangeuse d'âmes, sorcellerie et famille en Afrique, L'Harmattan, 1988, 187 p.
Zakari Tchagbale, Suzanne Lallemand,Toi et le ciel, vous et la terre : contes paillards tem du Togo, Société d'études linguistiques et anthropologiques de France : Agence de coopération culturelle et technique, Paris, 1982, 235 p.

Ethnic groups in Togo
Ethnic groups in Ghana
Ethnic groups in Benin